Thalia Iakovidou (born 10 September 1972) is a Greek athlete. She competed in the women's pole vault at the 2000 Summer Olympics.

References

1972 births
Living people
Athletes (track and field) at the 2000 Summer Olympics
Greek female pole vaulters
Olympic athletes of Greece
Athletes from Athens
Mediterranean Games silver medalists for Greece
Mediterranean Games medalists in athletics
Athletes (track and field) at the 2001 Mediterranean Games
21st-century Greek women